Lowell Township may refer to:

 Lowell Township, Cherokee County, Kansas
 Lowell Township, Michigan
 Lowell Township, Polk County, Minnesota
 Lowell Township, Kearney County, Nebraska
 Lowell Township, Marshall County, South Dakota, in Marshall County, South Dakota

Township name disambiguation pages